Aleksandr Filippovich Fedotov (1841–1895) was a Russian actor, theater director, and playwright affiliated with the Maly Theater and one of the founders of Moscow's Society of Art and Literature in 1887.

He had a profound influence on the young Konstantin Stanislavski, who later wrote that 

He was the husband of actress Glikeriya Fedotova.

References

1841 births
1895 deaths
Russian male actors
Russian dramatists and playwrights
Russian male dramatists and playwrights
Russian theatre directors
19th-century dramatists and playwrights from the Russian Empire
19th-century male actors from the Russian Empire
19th-century male writers from the Russian Empire